Sydney Luxton Loney, M.A. (16 March 1860 – 16 May 1939) was a Professor of Mathematics at the Royal Holloway College, Egham, Surrey, and a  fellow of Sidney Sussex College, Cambridge, England. He authored a number of mathematics texts, some of which have been reprinted numerous times. He is known as an early influence on Srinivasa Ramanujan.

Loney was educated at Maidstone Grammar School, in Tonbridge and at Sidney Sussex College, Cambridge, where he graduated with a B.A. as 3rd Wrangler in 1882. His books on Plane Trigonometry and Coordinate Geometry are very popular among senior high school students in India who are preparing for engineering entrance exams like JEE Advanced.

Bibliography

References

Sources

External links
 Plane Trigonometry, 1st Edition (1893) at the Internet Archive
 Plane Trigonometry, 2nd Edition (1895) at the Internet Archive

1860 births
1939 deaths
19th-century English mathematicians
20th-century British mathematicians
Academics of Royal Holloway, University of London
Fellows of Sidney Sussex College, Cambridge